Charles West (November 30, 1885 – October 10, 1943) was an American film actor of the silent film era. He appeared in more than 300 films between 1908 and 1937. He was born in Pittsburgh, Pennsylvania, and died in Los Angeles, California.

Selected filmography

 The Christmas Burglars (1908, Short)
 Love Finds a Way (1909, Short)
 The Fascinating Mrs. Francis (1909, Short)
 The Two Brothers (1910, Short) - A Suitor / A Mexican
 A Romance of the Western Hills (1910, Short) - The Nephew
 A Flash of Light (1910, Short) - John Rogers
 The Lucky Toothache (1910, Short) - One of the Boys
 The Fugitive (1910, Short) - Confederate Soldier / Union Soldier
 What Shall We Do with Our Old? (1911, Short)
 The Broken Cross (1911, Short) - Tom
 How She Triumphed (1911, Short)
 The Country Lovers (1911, Short) - The Country Lover
 The New Dress (1911, Short) - At Wedding / At Cafe
 Enoch Arden (1911, Short) - In Bar
 The Indian Brothers (1911, Short) - At Funeral
 The Last Drop of Water (1911, Short) - Jim - Mary's Sweetheart
 Out from the Shadow (1911, Short) - At Dance
 The Blind Princess and the Poet (1911, Short) - The Poet
 The Long Road (1911, Short) - Ned
 Love in the Hills (1911, Short) - The Shiftless Suitor
 The Battle (1911, Short) - The Boy - the Cowardly Soldier
 Through Darkened Vales (1911, Short) - Dave - Grace's Sweetheart
 The Old Bookkeeper (1912, Short) - In Office
 For His Son (1912, Short) - The Physician's Son
 Under Burning Skies (1912, Short) - The Bartender
 A String of Pearls (1912, Short) - The Poor Woman's Brother - the Neurasthenic Worker
 The Goddess of Sagebrush Gulch (1912, Short) - Blue Grass Pete
 One Is Business, the Other Crime (1912, Short) - The Poor Husband
 The Lesser Evil (1912, Short) - The Go-Between
 An Outcast Among Outcasts (1912, Short) - The Station Master
 A Temporary Truce (1912, Short) - Minor Role (uncredited)
 The Spirit Awakened (1912, Short)
 The Inner Circle (1912, Short)
 With the Enemy's Help (1912, Short) - The Prospector
 Blind Love (1912, Short)
 The Chief's Blanket (1912, Short) - The Outlaw
 A Sailor's Heart (1912, Short) - On Street (uncredited)
 My Hero (1912, Short) - Settler
 The Burglar's Dilemma (1912, Short) - The Doctor
 The God Within (1912, Short) - In Other Town
 A Misappropriated Turkey (1913, Short) - The Striker
 Oil and Water (1913, Short) - In First Audience / In Second Audience (uncredited)
 The Wrong Bottle (1913, Short) - The Faithless Lover
 A Girl's Stratagem (1913, Short) - The Lead Burglar
 A Welcome Intruder (1913, Short) - The Workman
 The Hero of Little Italy (1913, Short) - Joe
 The Stolen Bride (1913, Short) - The Overseer 
 A Frightful Blunder (1913, Short) - The Young Businessman
 The Left-Handed Man (1913, Short) - The Old Soldier's Daughter's Sweetheart
 The Wanderer (1913, Short) - The Friar
 Just Gold (1913, Short) - The Third Brother
 Red Hicks Defies the World (1913, Short) - In Crowd (uncredited)
 The Switch Tower (1913, Short) - Second Counterfeiter
 The Mothering Heart (1913, Short) - The 'New Light' / Among Waiters
 In Diplomatic Circles (1913, Short) - The Lover
 A Gamble with Death (1913, Short) - The Gambler
 A Gambler's Honor (1913, Short) - In Bar (uncredited)
 The Mirror (1913, Short) - Second Tramp
 The Vengeance of Galora (1913, Short) - The Express Agent
 When Love Forgives (1913, Short) - Harry - the Confidential Clerk
 Under the Shadow of the Law (1913, Short) - John Haywood - a Clerk
 I Was Meant for You (1913, Short) - Theron
 A Modest Hero (1913, Short) - A Crook / Cleaning Man
 A Tender-Hearted Crook (1913, Short) - James
 The Stopped Clock (1913, Short) - The Senior Clerk
 The Detective's Stratagem (1913, Short) - First Plotter
 All for Science (1913, Short) - In Restaurant (uncredited)
 Lord Chumley (1914, Short) - The Butler
 The Heart of a Bandit (1915, Short) - The Half-Bree
 His Desperate Deed (1915, Short) - Grant
 The Love Transcendent (1915, Short) - John Gag
 The Battle of Frenchman's Run (1915, Short)
 The Sheriff's Dilemma (1915, Short) - The Minister
 The Miser's Legacy (1915, Short) - The Crook's Pal
 The Gambler's I.O.U. (1915, Short) - Dick Smith
 A Double Winning (1915, Short) - 1st Sportsman
 A Day's Adventure (1915, Short) - Bentley
 Truth Stranger Than Fiction (1915, Short) - The Novelist
 Her Dormant Love (1915, Short) - The Attentive Husband
 The Burned Hand (1915, Short)
 The Woman from Warren's (1915, Short) - Hanson Landing
 Her Convert (1915, Short) - The Old Inventor
 Little Marie (1915, Short) - Beppo Puccini
 Old Offenders (1915, Short) - Crooked Joe
 The Wood Nymph (1916) - William Jones
 Let Katie Do It (1916) - Caleb Adams
 Martha's Vindication (1916) - William Burton
 The Heart of Nora Flynn (1916) - Jack Murray
 A Gutter Magdalene (1916) - Jack Morgan
 The Dream Girl (1916) - 'English' Hal
 Betty to the Rescue (1917) - Fleming
 The American Consul (1917) - Pedro Gonzales
 Little Miss Optimist (1917) - Ben Carden
 The Little Pirate (1917) -  George Drake
 The Trouble Buster (1917) - Tip Morgan
 Society's Driftwood (1917) - Tison Grant
 The Flash of Fate (1918) - Philadelphia Johnson
 Revenge (1918) - Donald Jaffray
 The White Man's Law (1918) - The Derelict
 Shackled (1918) - Walter Cosgrove
 The Ghost Flower (1918) - La Farge
 The Source (1918) - Paul Holmquist
 The Girl Who Came Back (1918) - Ralph Burton
 The Mystery Girl (1918) - Chester Naismith
 Wife or Country (1918, Short) - Jack Holiday
 A Very Good Young Man (1919) - Minor Role
 The Woman Michael Married (1919) - Harvey Kirkland
 His Divorced Wife (1919) - Rufus Couch
 The Phantom Melody (1920) - Gregory Baldi
 The River's End (1920) - Peter Kirkstone
 Polly of the Storm Country (1920) - Oscar Bennett
 Parlor, Bedroom and Bath (1920) - Jeffery Haywood
 Go and Get It (1920) - Slim Hogan
 A Thousand to One (1920) - Jimmy Munroe
 Not Guilty (1921) - Herbert Welch
 The Witching Hour (1921) - Tom Denning
 Bob Hampton of Placer (1921) - Maj. Brant
 The Lane That Had No Turning (1922) - Havel
 Manslaughter (1922) - Member of the Jury (uncredited)
 Love in the Dark (1922) - Jimmy Watson
 Red Lights (1923) - The Conductor
 The Eternal Three (1923) - Butler
 Times Have Changed (1923) - Al Keeley
 Held to Answer (1923) - 'Spider' Welch
 The Talker (1925) - Detective
 The Overland Limited (1925) - Bitter Root Jackson
 The Part Time Wife (1925) - Allen Keane
 The Fate of a Flirt (1925) - Eddie Graham
 The Road to Yesterday (1925) - Wyatt Earnshaw
 The Skyrocket (1926) - Edward Kimm (prologue)
 Snowed In (1926, Serial) - Harron
 The House Without a Key (1926, Serial) - Bowker
 Nobody's Widow (1927) - Valet
 The King of Kings (1927) - (uncredited)
 On the Stroke of Twelve (1927) - Charles Wright
 The Man from Headquarters (1928) - No. 1
 Handcuffed (1929)
 Acquitted (1929) - Henchman McManus
 For the Defense (1930) - Joe
 The Dawn Trail (1930) - Bartender (uncredited)
 Along Came Youth (1930) - Chauffeur
 The Texas Ranger (1931) - Bartender (uncredited)
 Law of the West (1932) - Dad Tracy
 The Man from Hell's Edges (1932) - Informant (uncredited)
 Law of the North (1932) - Bartender (uncredited)
 I Love That Man (1933) - Alarm Company Agent (uncredited)
 Police Car 17 (1933) - Harry
 Duck Soup (1933) - Minister (uncredited)
 Good Dame (1934) - Minor Role (uncredited)
 The Man Trailer (1934) - Gorman
 The Mighty Barnum (1934) - Hotel Porter (uncredited)
 Death from a Distance (1935) - Fingerprint Expert (uncredited)
 Barbary Coast (1935) - Gambler (uncredited)
 The Bride Comes Home (1935) - Bystander (uncredited)
 The Prisoner of Shark Island (1936) - Washington (DC) Citizen (uncredited)
 Don't Tell the Wife (1937) - Joe 'Hoss' Hoskins (uncredited)
 The Grapes of Wrath (1940) - Migrant (uncredited)

References

External links

1885 births
1943 deaths
American male film actors
American male silent film actors
Male actors from Pittsburgh
20th-century American male actors